Cox's Bazar Stadium, also known as Bir Shrestha Ruhul Amin Stadium is a football stadium situated by the south side of Cox's Bazar Medical College Hospital and east side of Cox's Bazar district council.

See also
 List of football stadiums in Bangladesh
 Stadiums in Bangladesh

References

Football venues in Bangladesh
Cox's Bazar